Charles Millar Burgess (20 November 1873 – 1960) was a Scottish footballer who played in the Football League for Newcastle United, and in the Scottish Division One for Dundee.

References

1873 births
1960 deaths
Scottish footballers
English Football League players
Association football defenders
Montrose F.C. players
Dundee F.C. players
Sunderland A.F.C. players
Millwall F.C. players
Newcastle United F.C. players
Portsmouth F.C. players